The Hudson, later Palmer Baronetcy, of Wanlip Hall in the County of Leicester, was created in the Baronetage of Great Britain on 28 July 1791 for Charles Grave Hudson, a Director of the South Sea Company and High Sheriff of Leicestershire in 1784. In 1813 the second Baronet assumed by royal sign-manual the surname of Palmer in lieu of his patronymic on succeeding to the estates of his maternal grandfather, Henry Palmer, of Wanlip. The title vests in its ninth holder.

Hudson, later Palmer baronets, of Wanlip Hall (1791)

Sir Charles Grave Hudson, 1st Baronet (1730–1813)
Sir Charles Thomas Hudson Palmer, 2nd Baronet (1771–1827)
Sir George Joseph Palmer, 3rd Baronet (1811–1866)
Sir Archdale Robert Palmer, 4th Baronet (1838–1905)
Sir George Hudson Palmer, 5th Baronet (1841–1919)
Sir Frederick Archdale Palmer, 6th Baronet (1857–1933)
Sir John Archdale Palmer, 7th Baronet (1894–1963)
Sir John Edward Somerset Palmer, 8th Baronet (1926–2019)
Sir Robert John Hudson Palmer, 9th Baronet (born 1960)

The heir apparent is Charles Henry Somerset Palmer (born 1992), eldest son of the above.

See also
 Palmer baronets

Notes

Baronetcies in the Baronetage of Great Britain
1791 establishments in Great Britain